Dame Emmeline Mary Tanner, DBE (28 December 1876 – 7 January 1955) was a British headmistress and educational reformer. She led several schools including Roedean. She was appointed a dame for her contribution to the 1944 Education Act.

Life 
Tanner was born in 1876 in Bath. She was one of seven children. Her younger sister, Beatrice Tanner, would be a notable nurse gaining a Royal Red Cross medal in 1919. Her parents, Samuel and Janette Jane ( Fry) Tanner, were keen for their children to receive an education but they could not fund advanced education. Her father was a coal merchant and a Justice of the Peace. 

She became a student teacher aged thirteen and spent her time teaching in private schools until she was employed by the Ladies' College, Halifax where she was trained. Tanner arranged her own education and submitted herself to the University of London where as an external candidate she obtained a first class history degree in 1904. The following year she was working at Sherborne School for Girls.

In 1908 she published a textbook on European history titled The Renaissance and the Reformation: A Textbook of European History 1494-1610. 

Nuneaton High School for Girls was founded in 1910 with the strong support of Warwickshire's Director of Education Bolton King. Tanner was the founding head. She enjoyed the support of Bolton King throughout her career and she joined Nuneaton's Education committee. She led the school in Nuneaton for about a decade and then she moved to Bedford High School where she again joined the education committee in addition to bringing reform to the school. 

Tanner was poached from Bedford to lead Roedean School in 1924 by Penelope Lawrence, one of Roedean's founders. She joined the education committee in Brighton. She had already been one of the four women on the consultative committee of the Board of Education and as head of Roedean she was asked to serve on that committee for another six years.

Tanner was Chair of the Association of Headmistresses and later their President from 1947 to 1939.

Damehood
She was made a dame for her contributions to drafting the 1944 Education Act as she had sat for two years on the Fleming committee which looked at public schools. The committee recommended that "opportunities of education in the public schools should be made available to boys and girls ... irrespective of the income of their parents."

Death
Tanner died in Marlborough in 1955, aged 78. 

In 1995, Susan Major  wrote Doors of Possibility: The Life of Dame Emmeline Tanner, 1876-1955, describing Tanner as a person who had emerged from a start in life without money or connections and had risen to the top assisting with the great changes that happened in education over her lifetime.

References

1876 births
1955 deaths
People from Bath, Somerset
Heads of schools in England
Dames Commander of the Order of the British Empire